The Revolutionary Communist Party of India, also known as RCPI (Das), was a political party in the Indian state of West Bengal, led by Anadi Das.

RCPI (Das) emerged as Anadi Das and M. Mokshed Ali, the two members of the West Bengal Legislative Assembly of the Revolutionary Communist Party of India, were expelled from RCPI in July 1969. Ahead of the 1971 West Bengal Legislative Assembly election the RCPI (Das) joined the Communist Party of India-led Eight Party Coalition. Moreover, RCPI (Das) joined the August Kranti Celebration Committee of seven political parties, which supported the struggle for independence of Bangla Desh.

After the 1971 election, RCPI (Das) merged into the RCPI (Tagore). After the death of Tagore, RCPI (Tagore) was split, with Das leading one of the factions and Bibhuti Bhushan Nandi the other.

References

Defunct communist parties in India
Political parties in West Bengal
1969 establishments in West Bengal
Political parties established in 1969
1971 disestablishments in India
Political parties disestablished in 1971